Iridovirus is a genus of viruses in the family Iridoviridae. Insects serve as natural hosts. Currently, only two species are placed  in this genus. Invertebrate iridescent virus 6 (IIV-6) was recognised as the type species until such a designation was abolished. IIV-6 is hosted by mosquitos and usually causes covert (inapparent) infection that reduces fitness. The remaining species Invertebrate iridescent virus 31  (IIV-31) is hosted by isopods and causes patent (apparent) infection characterised by blue to bluish-purple iridescence and a shortened lifespan.

Taxonomy
Group: dsDNA

Former species Invertebrate iridescent virus 1 (IIV-1) has been removed from Iridovirus. Its current status is a tentative member of Chloriridovirus.

Structure
Viruses in Iridovirus are enveloped, with icosahedral and polyhedral geometries, and T=147 symmetry. Their diameter is around 185 nm. Genomes are linear, around 213 kb in length. The genome codes for 211 proteins.

Lifecycle
Viral replication is nucleocytoplasmic. Entry into the host cell is achieved by attachment of the viral proteins to host receptors, which mediates endocytosis. Replication follows the DNA strand displacement model. DNA-templated transcription is the method of transcription. Invertebrates serve as their natural hosts.

References

External links

 ICTV Online (10th) Report: Iridoviridae
 Viralzone: Iridovirus

Iridoviridae
Virus genera